Robbins is an English language surname.  People with the name include:

A
 Aaron Robbins (born 1983), American football player
 Alan Robbins (born 1943), American politician 
 Alexandra Robbins (born 1976), American journalist and author
 Alfred Farthing Robbins (19th c.), British journalist and political biographer
 Alwyn Robbins (1920-2002), British geodesist
 Amy Robbins (born 1971), British stage, film and TV actress
 Amy Robbins (philanthropist) (born 1970), American businesswoman and philanthropist
 Andrea Robbins (born 1963), American artist
 Apollo Robbins (born 1974), American security consultant and magician
 Arthur Robbins (1920-2010), Australian rules football player
 Asher Robbins (1757–1845), US Senator from Rhode Island
 Austin Robbins (born 1971), American football player
 Avalon Robbins (born 2001), American model and actress
 Ayn Robbins (late 20th c.), lyricist

B
 Barbara Robbins (1943–1965), first American woman killed in the Vietnam War and first female CIA employee to die in action
 Barret Robbins (born 1973), American football player
 Ben Robbins (born 1976), Australian rules football player
 Benjamin Robbins (1857–1953), New Zealand politician  
 Benjamin Robbins Curtis (1809-1874), US attorney and Supreme Court Justice
 Bernie Robbins (early 21st c.), American businessman
 Betty Robbins (1924–2004), American cantor
 Brad Robbins (born 1985), Australian basketball player
 Brent Robbins (early 21st c.), American psychology professor
 Bret Robbins (early 21st c.), Video game creative director
 Brian Robbins (born 1963), American actor and producer
 Bruce Robbins (born 1959), American baseball player

C
 Calvin H. Robbins (1840-1900), American physician and politician
 Carla Robbins (born c. 1952), American journalist
 Caroline Robbins (1903–1999), British historian 
 Chandler Robbins (1918–2017), American ornithologist
 Charles Robbins (Royal Navy officer) (1782-1805), charted coast of southern Australia
 Charles Robbins (athlete), (1921-2006), American long distance runner
 Christopher Robbins (1946–2012), British writer and journalist
 Christopher Robbins (artist) (born 1973), American artist
 Chuck Robbins (late 20th/early 21st c.), American businessman
 Cindy Robbins (born 1937), American television actress and producer/writer
 Clifton Robbins (1890–1964), British journalist, writer, and executive of the International Labour Organization
 Clive Robbins (1927–2011), British music therapist
 Clyde Robbins (born 1931), United States Coast Guard vice admiral and senior civil servant 
 Clyde W. Robbins (1926–2001), American farmer and politician
 Colin Robbins (born 1964), British software engineer
 Corky Robbins (mid 20th c.), American singer and songwriter
 Cory Robbins (born 1957), American record executive

D
 Daniel Robbins (art historian) (1932-1995), American art historian
 Daniel Robbins (computer programmer) (early 21st c.), American computer programmer
 Darren Robbins (late 20th/early 21st c.), American  singer-songwriter
 Dave Robbins (trombonist) (1923–2005), American trombonist, composer, and teacher
 Dave Robbins (late 20th/early 21st c.), American keyboardist with country music band Blackhawk
 Dave Robbins (basketball) (born 1942), American basketball coach
 David L. Robbins (Oregon writer) (born 1950)
 David L. Robbins (Virginia writer) (born 1954)
 David P. Robbins (1942–2003), American mathematician
 David Robbins (composer) (born 1955), American composer of film soundtracks
 David Robbins (artist) (born 1957), American artist
 Derek Robbins (born 1952), Canadian skier
 Dennis Robbins (late 20th c.), American musician
 DeAnna Robbins (born 1959), American actress 
 Don Robbins  (born c. 1934), American football coach
 Doren Robbins (born 1949), American poet, writer, artist, educator, and cultural activist
 Doug Robbins (late 20th c.), founder of Robbinex, a consultative business intermediary firm
 Doug Robbins (baseball) (born 1966), former baseball catcher

E
 Edith Hyde Robbins, better known as Edith Hyde Robbins Macartney (1895-1978), first holder of the Miss America title
 Edmund Yard Robbins (1867–1942), American philosopher and professor
 Edward Robbins (1758–1837), Lieutenant Governor of Massachusetts and great-great-grandfather of Franklin Delano Roosevelt
 Edward E. Robbins (1860–1919), US Congressman from Pennsylvania
 Ellen Robbins (1828–1905), American botanical illustrator 
 Everett Robbins (early 20th c.), American musician

F
 Frank Robbins (1917–1994), American comic strip artist and writer
 Franklin Robbins (mid 20th c.), American tennis player
 Fred Robbins (born 1977), American football player
 Fred Robbins (broadcaster) (1919–1992), American radio personality and television host 
 Fred A. Robins (early 20th c.), American football and baseball coach
 Frederick Chapman Robbins (1916–2003), American pediatrician and virologist

G
 Gale Robbins (1921-1980), American actress and singer
 Garry Robbins (1957-2013), Canadian actor and professional wrestler
 Gaston A. Robbins (1858–1902), US Congressman from Alabama
 George R. Robbins (1808–1875), U.S. Representative from New Jersey
 George Collier Robbins (born 1823), mayor of Portland, Oregon, U.S., 1860–1861
 George Robbins (footballer) (1903–1998), Australian rules footballer
 Gil Robbins (1931–2011), American singer, musician, and actor 
 Gilbert F. Robbins (1838–1889), Mayor of Providence, Rhode Island
 Glen Robbins (early 20th c.), Canadian cyclist
 Glenn Robbins (born 1957), Australian comedian, writer, actor and radio personality
 Graham Robbins (born 1949), Australian rules football player
 Greg Robbins, American wrestler and silver medalist at 1987 Pan American Games

H
 Hanmer Robbins (1815-1881), American politician
 Hargus "Pig" Robbins (1938-2022), American musician 
 Harold Robbins (1916–1997), American author
 Harvey Frank Robbins (late 20th/early 21st c.), American cattle rancher
 Heidi Robbins (born 1991), American rower
 Herbert Robbins (1915–2001), American mathematician
 Hillman Robbins (1932–1981), American golfer
 Hollis Robbins (born 1963), American academic and scholar
 Horace Wolcott Robbins (1842–1904), American landscape painter

I
 Ira Robbins (late 20th c.), editor and publisher of music magazine Trouser Press
 Irv Robbins (1917–2008), founder of the Baskin-Robbins ice cream parlor chain

J
 Jake Robbins (born 1976), American baseball player
 James Robbins (journalist) (born 1954), BBC journalist
 James Robbins (shipbuilder), (died 1680), Danish shipbuilder
 James S. Robbins (born 1962), American author, professor, and special assistant to the US Undersecretary of Defense 
 James Watson Robbins (1801-1879), American physician and botanist
 Jane Robbins (born 1962), British sculptor
 Jane D. Robbins (1919 - 2008) American Compton City councillor
 J. Robbins (born 1976), American rock musician
 Jay M. Robbins (born 1945), American racehorse trainer
 Jay T. Robbins (1919–2001), U.S. Air Force General
 Jeff Robbins (born 1969), American musician and businessman
 Jennifer Niederst Robbins (late 20th/early 21st c.), American web designer
 Jerome Robbins (1918–1988), American choreographer, director, dancer, and theater producer 
 Jess Robbins (1886–1973), American film director, writer and producer
 Jesse Robbins (born 1978), American entrepreneur and firefighter
 Jimmy Robbins (born 1989), American singer-songwriter and producer
 JoAnne Robbins (late 20th/early 21st c.), American speech-language pathologist, academic, researcher and entrepreneur
 John Robbins (author) (born 1947), American author, known for his books on food and health
 John Robbins (congressman) (1808–1880), American congressman from Pennsylvania
 John Robbins (illustrator) (died 2016), host of the public television program Cover to Cover
 John B. Robbins (1932–2019), American medical researcher 
 John Everett Robbins (1903–1995), Canadian educator, encyclopedia editor and diplomat
 Jack Robbins (1916–1983), American football player
 Jack W. Robbins (1919–2005), American prosecutor at Nuremberg trials
 Joel Robbins (born 1961), American socio-cultural anthropologist
 Joni Robbins (late 20th c.), American voice actress
 Joseph E. Robbins (1901-1989), American film technician
 Josh Robbins (born 1983), American activist, blogger, talent agent, writer, and social media marketer

K
 Kate Robbins (born 1958), English actress, comedian, singer and songwriter
 Kelly Robbins (born 1969), American golfer
 Kenneth X. Robbins (late 20th/early 21st c.), American psychiatrist, art collector, and author 
 Kent Robbins (1947–1997), American songwriter
 Keith Robbins (1940-2019), British historian and university Vice-Chancellor

L
 Larry Robbins (born 1969), American hedge fund manager
 Lee Robbins (1922–1968), American basketball player
 Lindy Robbins (late 20th/early 21st c.), American songwriter
 Lionel Robbins (1898–1984), British economist
 Lorcan Robbins (1885-1939), Irish politician
 Louise S. Robbins (late 20th/early 21st c.), American academic and librarian
 Lynn G. Robbins (born 1952), American general authority of the Church of Jesus Christ of Latter-day Saints

M
 Marc Robbins (1868–1931), American actor
 Marcus Robbins (1851–1924), US Army Medal of Honor recipient
 Marty Robbins (1925–1982), American country singer
 Matthew Robbins (footballer) (born 1977), Australian rules footballer
 Matthew Robbins (screenwriter) (born 1945), American screenwriter, producer and director
 Merle Robbins (c. 1912–1984), inventor of the card game UNO
 Michael Robbins (1930–1992), British actor
 Missy Robbins (born 1971), American chef
 Monte Robbins (born 1964), American football player

N
 Naomi B. Robbins, American expert in data visualization
 Neil Robbins (1929–2020), Australian long-distance runner
 Noah Robbins, American actor

O
 Obedience Robbins (1600–1662), Virginia burgess 
 Oliver Robbins (born 1975), British civil servant and Permanent Secretary of the Department for Exiting the European Union
 Ormond Robbins (1910–1984), American author
Otho S. Robbins (1855-1927), American politician

P
 Paddy Robbins (1914–1986), Irish footballer
 Pete Robbins (born 1978), American saxophonist and composer
 Peter Robbins (actor) (born 1956), voice of Charlie Brown
 Peter Robbins (author) (born 1946), British author 
 Peter Robbins (rugby union) (1933–1987), England rugby union player
 Phillips Robbins (born 1930), American biochemistry professor
 Prospect K. Robbins (1788-1847), American surveyor

R
 Randy Robbins (American football) (born 1962), American football player
 Randy Robbins (director) (late 20th/early 21st c.), American television director
 Raymond Francis Robbins (1912–1980), American artist
 Red Robbins (1944–2009), American basketball player
 Rex Robbins (1935–2003), American actor and singer
 Richard Robbins (anthropologist) (born 1940), American anthropology professor 
 Richard Robbins (artist) (1927-2009), British sculptor
 Richard Robbins (composer) (1940-2012), American film score composer
 Richard Robbins (poet) (late 20th/early 21st c.), American poet
 Richard E. Robbins (early 21st c.), American filmmaker and documentarian
 Robert D. Robbins (born 1944), American politician
 Rockie Robbins (late 20th c.), American singer
 Royal Robbins (1935-2017), American climber
 Royal Robbins (minister) (1788–1861), American minister
 Ryan Robbins (born 1972), Canadian actor
 Ryan Robbins (footballer) (born 1988), English football player

S
 Sally Robbins (born 1981), Australian rower
 Samuel Robbins (born c. 1790), a member of the crew of HMS Victory
 Samuel Robbins Brown (1810–1880), American missionary
 Samuel K. Robbins (1853-1926), New Jersey state politician
 Sarah Robbins (born 1992), Canadian soccer player
 Sarah Fraser Robbins (1911-2002) American natural history writer, educator and environmentalist
 Saul Robbins (1922-2010), American toy manufacturer, co-founder of Remco
 Silas Robbins (1857–1916), American lawyer
 Silas Webster Robbins (1785–1871), American lawyer and judge 
 Stephen Robbins (born 1953), British Army Chaplain-General
 Stuart Robbins (1976–2010), British basketball player

T
 Ted Robbins (born 1955), English actor, television presenter and radio broadcaster
 Terence Robbins (1934–2015), Welsh rugby player
 Terry Robbins (1947–1970), American activist
 Terry Robbins (footballer) (born 1965), English footballer 
 Thomas Robbins (minister) (1777–1856), American teacher, minister, and librarian
 Thomas Robbins (sociologist) (1943–2015), American scholar and author 
 Thomas H. Robbins, Jr. (1900-1972), American admiral
 Tim Robbins (born 1958), American actor, director and activist
 Tod Robbins (1888–1949), American author
 Todd Robbins (born 1958), American magician, lecturer, actor, and author
 Tom Robbins (born 1932), American author
 Tom Alan Robbins (early 21st c.), American actor
 Tony Robbins (born 1960), American motivational speaker and life coach
 Tootie Robbins (born 1958), American football player
 Trevor Robbins (born 1949), British professor of cognitive neuroscience
 Trina Robbins (born 1938),  American cartoonist and author
 Tristan Robbins (born 1996), British cyclist

V
 Vernon K. Robbins (born 1939), American bible scholar and historian

W
 Walter Robbins (1910–1979), Welsh football player
 Warren Delano Robbins (1885–1935), American diplomat
 Warren M. Robbins (1923–2008), American art collector
 Wayne Robbins (1914–1958), American author 
 Wendy Robbins (born 1963), British radio and television presenter and producer
 William Robbins (actor) (died 1645), comic actor in the Jacobean and Caroline eras
 William Robbins (athlete) (1885–1962), American Olympic runner
 William D. Robbins (1874–1952), Mayor of Toronto
 William Jacob Robbins (1890-1978), American botanist and physiologist
 William M. Robbins (1828–1905), US Congressman from North Carolina

Surnames
English-language surnames